Piotr Abramowicz (1619–1697) was a Polish Jesuit.

References

1619 births
1697 deaths
17th-century Polish Jesuits